WRBS (1230 kHz) is an AM radio station broadcasting a Christian talk format. Licensed to Baltimore, Maryland, the station serves the Baltimore area.  The station is owned by WRBS-AM, LLC, a subsidiary of Peter and John Radio Fellowship, Inc.

WRBS (1230) airs Christian talk and teaching programs, such as David Jeremiah, John MacArthur and Alistair Begg, and live call-in shows like The Dave Ramsey Show.

History

WITH
WITH went on the air March 1, 1941, operating 24 hours a day with 250 watts power on 1200 kHz. It was owned and operated by Thomas Garland Tinsley and his family. Opening ceremonies included "a broadcast from the stage of the Maryland Theater, featuring seven songwriters represented by the American Society of Composers, Authors and Musicians, which was fighting with the radio networks over copyrights."

WRBS 
In 2006, the Peter and John Radio Fellowship, Inc. acquired the station, the former WITH (1230) and changed its call letters to WRBS. The FM station is now licensed under the call letters WRBS-FM.

References

External links

FCC History Cards for WRBS

RBS (AM)
RBS (AM)
Moody Radio affiliate stations
Radio stations established in 1941
1941 establishments in Maryland